Princewill Ushie Okachi (born 20 June 1991, in Lagos), or simply Prince, is a Nigerian footballer who plays for  Widzew Łódź in polish 4th division.

Career
He started his professional career in Dingli Swallows as a striker. Then in 2011 he moved to Widzew Łódź, where he started play as a midfielder. After three years spent in Widzew Łódź his contract was terminated due to financial issues. In consequence in September 2014 he signed a contract with Panthrakikos, where he played in 3 games in the Greek Superleague. However, after one round of season 2014–2015 he decided to come back to Poland to his family, and closer to his daughter in Denmark. In the beginning of season 2015/2016 he joined rebuild Widzew Łódź.

Club
In July 2011, he was loaned to Widzew Łódź on a one-year deal. He made his debut in Ekstraklasa on 5 August 2011.

In summer 2014 his contract with Widzew Łódź was terminated due to financial issues, thus in September 2014 he moved as a free player to Panthrakikos, where he played in 3 games in the Greek Superleague.

In July 2015 he returned to Widzew Łódź, in order to help rebuild team after bankruptcy and relegation to polish 4th division.

References

External links
 

1991 births
Living people
Nigerian footballers
Widzew Łódź players
Ekstraklasa players
Expatriate footballers in Poland
Nigerian expatriates in Poland
F.C. Ebedei players
Association football midfielders